Hans Tausen's Church (Danish: Hans Tausens Kirke) is a Church of Denmark parish church in the Islands Brygge neighbourhood of Copenhagen, Denmark. It is named after Hans Tausen, the leading theologian of the Danish Reformation.

History
Islands Brygge Parish was disjoined from Christianshavn Parish on 20 December 1915. A temporary church hall, the current congregation hall (Menighedssal), was inaugurated that same year.

The current church was designed by Fredrik Appel and Kristen Gording. The foundation stone was set on 27 May 1923 and the church was inaugurated on 30 November 1924. The tower was not built until 1936.

Architecture
The church is built in red brick. The interior stands in white-washed brick.

Culture 
Hans Tausen's church facilitates the use of its infrastructure to cultural groups such as the Chamber Choir Musica.

References

External links

 Official website

Churches in Amager
Lutheran churches in Copenhagen
20th-century Church of Denmark churches
Churches completed in 1924
1924 establishments in Denmark
Churches in the Diocese of Copenhagen